The Korea Open is an annual badminton event that is commonly held in Seoul, South Korea. The tournament used to be known as Korea Open Super Series because it became one of the BWF Super Series tournaments beginning with 2007. BWF categorised Korea Open as one of the seven BWF World Tour Super 500 events in the BWF events structure since 2018.

The tournament is organised since 1991, however the 1998 tournament was canceled due to the poor economic conditions in the country.

History of host cities

Past winners

Performances by nation

References

External links
Official website
BWF: Korea Open
2017 Victor Korea Open

 
Badminton tournaments in South Korea
1991 establishments in South Korea
Recurring sporting events established in 1991